Gyeonggi International Trade High School (경기국제통상고등학교) is a public High School located in Bucheon, Gyeonggi-do, South Korea.

History
1st Nov 1994, Founded as Bumyung Information Industrial High School (부명정보산업고등학교).
21st Aug 2010, Constructed a new building named Du-ri-kwan (두리관).
1st Mar 2011, Renamed to Gyeonggi International Trade High School.

Departments
 Department of Foreign Language for International Trade (국제통상외국어과)
 Department of Information Technology for International Business Administration (국제경영정보과)
 Department of International Tourism Management (국제관광경영과)
 Department of International Accounting Information (국제회계정보과)

Foreign relations
  Tokuyama University
  University of East Asia
  Bohai University
  National Changhua Senior School of Commerce

External links
 Official website 

High schools in South Korea
Schools in Gyeonggi Province
Bucheon
Educational institutions established in 1994
1994 establishments in South Korea